The  (lit. North Kantō Expressway) is a 4-laned national expressway in Japan. It is owned and operated by East Nippon Expressway Company.

Overview

The route connects the capitals of the three northern prefectures in the Kantō region: Maebashi, Utsunomiya, and Mito.

The expressway begins at a junction with the Kan-etsu Expressway in Gunma Prefecture and heads east along the southern edge of the prefecture. The route ends abruptly in the city of Ōta, however the route will be extended to a junction with the Tōhoku Expressway in Tochigi Prefecture by 2011. The expressway then follows the route of the Tōhoku Expressway northward for about 13 km, then diverges from this expressway following an easterly course once more. It runs through the southern areas of Utsunomiya and heads into eastern areas of Tochigi Prefecture, where the route terminates once again in the city of Mooka. The section connecting Tochigi and Ibaraki Prefectures was scheduled to be completed in 2009. From Sakuragawa in western Ibaraki, the route continues towards a junction with the Jōban Expressway and runs along the southern edge of the Mito city area, where the expressway has its final terminus. At the terminus, the Higashi-Mito Road continues towards the Pacific Ocean coastline using the same roadway.

The route runs parallel to National Route 50 for most of its length.

List of interchanges and features 

 IC - interchange, SIC - smart interchange, JCT - junction, SA - service area, PA - parking area, BR - bridge

References

External links 

 East Nippon Expressway Company
 Ibaraki Kitakan (info page by Ibaraki Prefectural Government)

Expressways in Japan
Proposed roads in Japan
Ashikaga, Tochigi